Behr is a surname of German origin.

Behr may also refer to:
 Behr (paint), an American paint manufacturer
 Behr Brothers & Co. (1880–1910), a piano manufacturing company
 Behr GmbH & Co. KG, a German automobile parts manufacturer
 Behr Glacier, Victoria Land, Antarctica
 Behr syndrome, a genetic disorder causing early-onset optic atrophy

See also
 Bear (disambiguation)